The 2022 World Field Archery Championships were held at Lewis and Clark Lake Field Range and NFAA Easton Yankton Archery Center, Yankton, United States.

Medal summary

Elite events

Junior events

References

Fie
World Archery Field Championships
International archery competitions hosted by the United States
World Field Archery Championships
World Archery Field Championships
World Archery Field Championships